Dipeptide hydrolase may refer to:
 Membrane dipeptidase, an enzyme
 Angiotensin-converting enzyme, an enzyme